"Oh Well" is a song first recorded by the rock band Fleetwood Mac in 1969, composed by vocalist and lead guitarist Peter Green. It first appeared as a Fleetwood Mac single in various countries in 1969 and subsequently appeared on revised versions of that year's Then Play On album and the band's Greatest Hits album in 1971. The song was later featured on the 1992 boxed set 25 Years – The Chain, on the 2002 compilation album The Best of Peter Green's Fleetwood Mac, and on the 2018 compilation 50 Years – Don't Stop.

"Oh Well" was composed in two parts, with "Part 1" as a fast electric blues song with vocals (lasting 2:19), and "Part 2" as an entirely different instrumental piece with a classical influence (lasting 5:39). The original 1969 single features the first minute of "Part 2" as a fade-out coda to the A-side and then "Part 2" begins again on the B-side. Later releases varied in length. During concerts, only the first part was played, and live versions of the song have been released on a handful of Fleetwood Mac live albums throughout their career such as Live and Live at the BBC, as well as the B-sides of singles. After Green's departure from Fleetwood Mac, the song was sung by various other members, including Bob Welch, Dave Walker, Lindsey Buckingham, Billy Burnette, and Mike Campbell.

Composition 
Peter Green wrote what would be part 2 of "Oh Well" on a Ramirez Spanish guitar, which he purchased after hearing the instrument on the radio. "Part 1", which Green dismissed as a "throwaway riff", was intended to appear on the flip side of Part 2.

The first part of the song features a fast blues guitar riff played by Green, then joined by Danny Kirwan and bassist John McVie, before a musical silence, punctuated only by Mick Fleetwood's cowbell percussion. Green sings a brief verse with no musical accompaniment, before the riff begins again and Kirwan plays a solo. Another silence precedes a second verse, and a replay of the riff.

Where the second part follows, there is a brief pause before Green's sombre, Spanish-style acoustic guitar and low electric guitar, leading into further instrumental passages of recorder, cello, and piano, the latter played by Jeremy Spencer. It was Spencer's only contribution to the song, as he was absent from the recording of "Part 1", and Green played all the other instruments in "Part 2".

During live performances with the original lineup, Spencer frequently played supplemental percussion during the song, often maracas.

Release 
Instead of including "Oh Well" on the UK track listing of Then Play On, the label chose the song as the band's next single, which came as a surprise to the song's writer, Peter Green, who expected Kirwan's "When You Say" to receive that designation. Hesitant to release "Oh Well Part 1" as a single, Green lobbied to make "Part 2" the A-side instead, but to no avail. Fleetwood and McVie bet Green eight pounds apiece that "Oh Well" would flop, but the single instead went on to chart in several territories.

After the single was released, US versions of Then Play On were updated to include the song. The album edit of "Oh Well" simply joined the two sides of the single as one track, entitled "Oh Well" (lasting 8:56), so that "Part 2"'s beginning is heard twice. It was repeated on the worldwide original CD release. A 1972 US reissue of the single featured just the electric "Part 1" without the coda. Other reissues of the song, including on the Greatest Hits album and the 2013 Deluxe Then Play On, feature the original single releases of Part 1 (with coda) and Part 2 as two separate tracks.

Chart performance 
The single's peak position on the UK Charts was No. 2 for two weeks in November 1969, spending a total of 16 weeks on the chart. In the Dutch Top 40, the song peaked at No. 1 and spent a total of 11 weeks in the top 40. It also reached the top 5 in Ireland, Norway, New Zealand, and France, as well as the top 10 in Germany and Switzerland.

"Oh Well" was a minor hit in the United States, where it reached No. 55, becoming Fleetwood Mac's first single to reach the Hot 100, as well as their only pre-Buckingham/Nicks song to earn this distinction. It did receive a lot of airplay on some FM album-oriented stations and its reputation has grown in the years since its release.

In Canada, the song reached No. 54. It was their second charting single after Albatross in March 1969.

The single was also issued in Argentina, Brazil, India, Italy, Japan, Lebanon, Mexico (as "Ah Bueno"), Portugal and Spain (as "Muy Bien"), and South Africa and Venezuela (as "Oh Bien") on Reprise Records. Other countries included Greece on Warner Bros. Records and Malaysia on Jaguare Records.

Legacy 
"Oh Well, Part 1" has been viewed by music critics as one of the early crossovers between blues rock and heavy metal, along with songs by bands such as Led Zeppelin. John Paul Jones drew inspiration from "Oh Well, Part 1" when composing the riff for "Black Dog". Both songs employ "call and response vocals and a syncopated ascending chromatic motif that finishes with a long sustained note."

Personnel 
Oh Well Part 1
Peter Green – vocals, electric guitar, dobro
Danny Kirwan – electric guitar
John McVie – bass guitar
Mick Fleetwood – drums, cowbell, congas, maracas, claves

Oh Well Part 2
Peter Green – classical guitar, electric guitar, bass guitar, cello, timpani, clash cymbals
Jeremy Spencer – piano
Additional Personnel
Sandra Elsdon – recorder

Charts

Weekly charts

Cover versions and other uses 
"Oh Well" has been covered by various other artists and groups, including Billy Gibbons, Deep Purple, Tom Petty and the Heartbreakers, 2Cellos, Kenny Wayne Shepherd, Monks of Doom, Gordon Giltrap, Joe Jackson, The Rockets, Big Country, Tribe of Gypsies, Ratt, Tourniquet, McCoy, John Parr, Oh Well, Haim, Aerosmith, Jason Isbell and the 400 Unit, and Darrell Mansfield. The song has also been played live by Jimmy Page & the Black Crowes and released on their 2000 album Live at the Greek. The Australian singer-songwriter Rick Springfield performed a version of the song in July 2013 for The A.V. Club's A.V. Undercover series. Eels included a cover of the song on the bonus-disc edition of their 2014 album The Cautionary Tales of Mark Oliver Everett, and it is also found on the 2012 album Fifteen by Colin James.

Former Fleetwood Mac member Bob Welch recorded a version of the song for the 2003 His Fleetwood Mac Years & Beyond album. To outline the sections, Welch played his guitars along to the original recording so his cover would "closely match the original, but not be exact copies." After the guitars were tracked, Welch gradually muted the original recording as he filled out the song with samples and MIDI. Over the course of a couple weeks, Welch had amassed between 64 and 96 individual tracks. For the master mix, he whittled it down to 32 tracks because he found it too difficult to monitor all of the parts he recorded.

An excerpt from the song can be heard in the Doctor Who story Spearhead from Space. It was filmed around the same time that the single was on the chart, and transmitted in January 1970. The song was omitted from later video releases of the story, but was reintroduced on the DVD release in 2011. The beginning of the song from Live in Boston by Fleetwood Mac can be heard in the second season of the television show Fargo.
Part 2 was also sampled by the KLF for their Chill Out album.

In 2021 Deep Purple did a cover version of "Oh Well", which appears on the album Turning to Crime.

References

External links 
Oh Well at Discogs.com
Oh Well at Last.fm
Oh Well 1972 reissue at Discogs.com
Details of 41 different recordings of "Oh Well" by Fleetwood Mac's various iterations

1969 songs
1969 singles
Songs written by Peter Green (musician)
Fleetwood Mac songs
British hard rock songs
British folk rock songs
Reprise Records singles